The Diocese of Thrace was a diocese of the later Roman Empire, incorporating the provinces of the eastern Balkan Peninsula (comprising territories in modern south-eastern Romania, central and eastern Bulgaria, and Greek and Turkish Thrace). Philippopolis (modern Plovdiv, in Bulgaria) was the capital.

The diocese was established as part of the reforms of Diocletian and Constantine the Great, and was headed by a vicarius subordinate to the praetorian prefecture of the East.

In May 535, with Novel 26, Justinian I abolished the Diocese of Thrace. Its vicarius retained his rank of vir spectabilis and received the new title of praetor Justinianus, uniting in his hand both civil and military authority over the provinces of the former diocese, in a crucial departure from the strict separation of authority from the Diocletianian system. A year later, in May 536, the two Danubian provinces, Moesia Inferior and Scythia, where detached to form, along with other provinces, the quaestura exercitus.

List of known Vicarii Thraciarum 
 Aelius Claudius Dulcitius (?–361)
 Capitolinus (361–363)
 Andronicus
 Philoxenus
 Solomon (?–582)

References

Sources 

 

Thrace
Roman Thrace
Greece in the Roman era
Civil dioceses of the Byzantine Empire
Medieval Thrace
Geography of ancient Thrace
Ancient history of Romania
Bulgaria in the Roman era
History of Dobruja
Praetorian prefecture of the East
314 establishments
States and territories established in the 310s
535 disestablishments
States and territories disestablished in the 530s